Keeper of the Castle is an album by R&B group the Four Tops, released in 1972.

The title track peaked at No. 18 on the UK Singles Chart.

Critical reception
Robert Christgau wrote that with "superschlockers" Steve Barri, Dennis Lambert, and Brian Potter producing, "the results are too overbearing to interest anyone but professional theorists of camp."

Track listing
All tracks composed by Brian Potter and Dennis Lambert; except where indicated
"Keeper of the Castle"
"Ain't No Woman (Like the One I've Got)"
"Put a Little Love Away"
"Turn On the Light of Your Love" (Len Perry, Levi Stubbs, Jr., Renaldo Benson, Abdul Fakir)
"When Tonight Meets Tomorrow" (Al Cleveland, Renaldo Benson, Len Perry)
"Love Music"
"Remember What I Told You to Forget"
"(I Think I Must Be) Dreaming"
"The Good Lord Knows" (Renaldo Benson, Len Perry)
"Jubilee With Soul" (Joe Smith, Val Benson, Renaldo Benson)
"Love Makes You Human" (Val Benson, Renaldo Benson, Len Perry)
"Keeper of the Castle (Reprise)"

Personnel
Levi Stubbs — lead vocals
Lawrence Payton — background vocals
Renaldo "Obie" Benson — background vocals
Abdul "Duke" Fakir — background vocals
David Cohen, Joe Smith, Larry Carlton, Richard Bennett — guitar
Ron Brown, Wilton Felder — bass
Paul Humphrey — drums
Brian Potter, Gary Coleman, King Errisson, Victor Feldman — percussion
Dennis Lambert — keyboards
Jimmie Haskell — Moog synthesizer, string and horn arrangements
Dennis Lambert, Don Hockett, Gil Askey - string and horn arrangements
Jerome Richardson - piccolo flute solo on "When Tonight Meets Tomorrow" and saxophone solo on "Love Makes You Human"
Tony Terran - trumpet solo on "Love Music"
Chip Crawford - organ solo on "Love Makes You Human"
Sid Sharp — string conductor
Rudy Mazur - art work

References 

1972 albums
Four Tops albums
ABC Records albums
Dunhill Records albums
Albums arranged by Jimmie Haskell